Sooji may be:
The South Asian name for semolina
Okita Sooji (1842 or 1844 – 1868), member of the Shinsengumi (special police force) in Kyoto, Japan
Alternative spelling of Su-ji, Korean given name

See also
Atta flour
Ji-su
Suji (disambiguation)
Soo (disambiguation)
Ji (disambiguation)